The following is a list of Special Areas of Conservation in Wales.

A
 Aberbargoed Grasslands
 Afon Eden – Cors Goch Trawsfynydd
 Afon Gwyrfai a Llyn Cwellyn
 Afon Teifi/ River Teifi
 Afon Tywi/ River Tywi
 Afonydd Cleddau/ Cleddau Rivers
 Alyn Valley Woods/ Coedwigoedd Dyffryn Alun

B
 Bae Cemlyn/ Cemlyn Bay
 Berwyn a Mynyddoedd de Clwyd/ Berwyn and South Clwyd Mountains
 Blackmill Woodlands
 Blaen Cynon
 Brecon Beacons/ Bannau Brycheiniog

C
 Cadair Idris
 Caeau Mynydd Mawr
 Cardiff Beech Woods
 Cardigan Bay/ Bae Ceredigion
 Carmarthen Bay and Estuaries/ Bae Caerfyrddin ac Aberoedd
 Carmarthen Bay Dunes/ Twyni Bae Caerfyrddin
 Cernydd Carmel
 Clogwyni Pen Llyn/ Seacliffs of Lleyn
 Coed Cwm Einion
 Coed y Cerrig
 Coedwigoedd Dyffryn Elwy/ Elwy Valley Woods
 Coedwigoedd Penrhyn Creuddyn/ Creuddyn Peninsula Woods
 Coedydd a Cheunant Rheidol/ Rheidol Woods and Gorge
 Coedydd Aber
 Coedydd Derw a Safleoedd Ystlumod Meirion/ Meirionnydd Oakwoods and Bat Sites
 Coedydd Llawr-y-glyn
 Coedydd Nedd a Mellte
 Coetiroedd Cwm Elan/ Elan Valley Woodlands
 Cors Caron
 Cors Fochno
 Corsydd Eifionydd
 Corsydd Llyn/ Lleyn Fens
 Corsydd Môn/ Anglesey Fens
 Crymlyn Bog/ Cors Crymlyn
 Cwm Cadlan
 Cwm Clydach Woodlands / Coedydd Cwm Clydach
 Cwm Doethie – Mynydd Mallaen

D-F
 Dee Estuary/ Aber Dyfrdwy (part in England)
 Deeside and Buckley Newt Sites
 Dolmelynllyn Estate
 Drostre Bank
 Dunraven Bay
 Elenydd
 Eryri/ Snowdonia
 Fenn`s, Whixall, Bettisfield, Wem and Cadney Mosses (part in England)

 Gallt Melyd area of conservation including wetlands
 Glannau Môn: Cors heli / Anglesey Coast: Saltmarsh
 Glannau Ynys Gybi/ Holy Island Coast
 Glan-traeth
 Glaswelltiroedd Cefn Cribwr/ Cefn Cribwr Grasslands
 Glynllifon
 Gower Ash Woods/ Coedydd Ynn Gwyr
 Gower Commons/ Tiroedd Comin Gwyr
 Granllyn
 Great Orme`s Head/ Pen y Gogarth
 Grogwynion
 Gweunydd Blaencleddau

H-L
 Halkyn Mountain/ Mynydd Helygain
 Johnstown Newt Sites
 Kenfig/ Cynffig
 Limestone Coast of South West Wales/ Arfordir Calchfaen de Orllewin Cymru
 Llangorse Lake/ Llyn Syfaddan
 Llwyn
 Llyn Dinam

M-O
 Migneint–Arenig–Dduallt
 Montgomery Canal
 Morfa Harlech a Morfa Dyffryn
 Mwyngloddiau Fforest Gwydir/ Gwydyr Forest Mines
 Mynydd Epynt
 North Pembrokeshire Woodlands/ Coedydd Gogledd Sir Benfro
 North West Pembrokeshire Commons/ Comins Gogledd Orllewin Sir Benfro

P,Q
 Pembrokeshire Bat Sites and Bosherston Lakes/ Safleoedd Ystlum Sir Benfro a Llynnoedd Bosherston
 Pembrokeshire Marine/ Sir Benfro Forol
 Pen Llyn a`r Sarnau/ Lleyn Peninsula and the Sarnau
 Preseli

R
 Rhinog
 Rhos Goch
 Rhos Llawr-cwrt
 Rhos Talglas
 River Dee and Bala Lake/ Afon Dyfrdwy a Llyn Tegid (part in England)
 River Usk/ Afon Wysg
 River Wye/ Afon Gwy (part in England)

S-V
 St David`s / Ty Ddewi
 Severn Estuary/ Mor Hafren (part in England)
 Sugar Loaf Woodlands
 Tanat and Vyrnwy Bat Sites/ Safleoedd Ystlumod Tanat ac Efyrnwy
 Usk Bat Sites/ Safleoedd Ystlumod Wysg

W-Z
 Wye Valley and Forest of Dean Bat Sites/ Safleoedd Ystlumod Dyffryn Gwy a Fforest y Ddena (part in England)
 Wye Valley Woodlands/ Coetiroedd Dyffryn Gwy (part in England)
 Y Fenai a Bae Conwy/ Menai Strait and Conwy Bay
 Y Twyni o Abermenai i Aberffraw/ Abermenai to Aberffraw Dunes
 Yerbeston Tops

See also

 List of Special Areas of Conservation in England
 List of Special Areas of Conservation in Scotland
 List of Special Areas of Conservation in Northern Ireland

Sources

 JNCC list of UK SACs (accessed on 30 October 2006, revisited 06 Nov 2011)

 
Special Areas of Conservation
Lists of protected areas of the United Kingdom